Mario Ghella (23 June 1929 – 2020) was a former Italian racing cyclist and Olympic champion in track cycling. He won a gold medal in the individual sprint event at the 1948 Summer Olympics in London.

References

External links
 

1929 births
2020 deaths
Italian male cyclists
Olympic gold medalists for Italy
Cyclists at the 1948 Summer Olympics
Olympic cyclists of Italy
Italian track cyclists
Sportspeople from the Metropolitan City of Turin
Olympic medalists in cycling
Medalists at the 1948 Summer Olympics
Cyclists from Piedmont